Ruan Pienaar (born 10 March 1984) is a South African professional rugby union player who currently plays either as a scrum-half or as a fly-half for the   in the Currie Cup.

Pienaar is the son of former Springbok fullback Gysie Pienaar. Ruan is regarded as a very skilful rugby player. Besides being able to pass well, he can kick with both feet, and his vision and running style moved former Springbok coach Jake White to compare him with Australian fly-half Stephen Larkham.

Pienaar has been part of u19 (2003), u21 (2005) and senior Rugby World Cup (2007) winning squads. He also won the Currie Cup in 2008 and 2019.

International career
Pienaar made his debut for the Springboks in the 2006 Tri-Nations against New Zealand and was a member of the successful 2007 World Cup squad. As he did not play club rugby in South Africa since June 2010 it seemed unlikely that he would be called up again to play for the national team. SARU has a policy of selecting foreign based players in exceptional circumstances only. However, on 20 June 2011 it was reported that Pienaar had been named in South Africa's 49-Man World Cup preliminary training squad. Pienaar has been an ever present in South Africa squads ever since.

Club career

South Africa
Pienaar played his high school rugby in Bloemfontein, where he attended Grey College. He was selected for the Free State Craven Week side in 2002.

Ulster
Ulster announced on 27 May 2010 that they had signed Pienaar on a two-year contract. Pienaar would play in the Celtic League and Heineken Cup along with fellow Springboks Johann Muller, Robbie Diack, Pedrie Wannenburg and BJ Botha at the Belfast based side. He made his Magners League debut on 1 October, scoring all of Ulster's 19 points in their victory over Glasgow Warriors. Pienaar was named at scrum half in the Magners League Team of the Year for the 2010/11 season and also scooped the Magners League player of the Year award which was voted for by his peers.

Pienaar signed a two-year extension to his Ulster contract during this time. Pienaar was again selected at scrum half for the Pro12 Dream Team for the 2011/12 season and was also named captain of the side. In 2012 Pienaar played in the Heineken Cup Final, scoring 9 points in the 42–14 defeat to Leinster. In 2013 he played in the Pro 12 Final, scoring all of Ulster's 18 points in the 24–18 loss to Leinster.

In October 2013 despite strong media reports linking him with Toulon, Pienaar signed a new 3-year extension to his Ulster contract keeping him in Belfast until the end of the 2016/17 season. No further contracts were offered due to the IRFU succession policy, limiting all four of the provinces to one foreign player per position. Pienaar's position at Ulster was untenable once Leinster signed a half back from New Zealand. He left the club as one of its most celebrated players of the professional era.

Later career
Pienaar played for Montpellier during the 2017/18 season before returning home to South Africa in 2019, signing with Pro14 outfit the Cheetahs where he also played Currie Cup. Prior to the inaugural United Rugby Championship, Pienaar was loaned to the Sharks for the 2021/22 season as part of work carried out to ensure as many of the best South African players were playing for the South African teams in the tournament as possible.

Personal life
Pienaar is a devout Christian, saying “I have always believed, with my Christianity, that there’s so much more to life than rugby,” and “Being here gives me an enormous sense of purpose. I am not just here for rugby, I’m here to touch lives.” He is the co-founder of a Bible study group for rugby players in South Africa. While playing for Ulster he regularly attended the Christian Fellowship Church on Belmont Road in Belfast.

Notes

References

External links

Profile with the Sharks

1984 births
Living people
Afrikaner people
South African Christians
South African rugby union players
South Africa international rugby union players
Rugby union scrum-halves
Alumni of Grey College, Bloemfontein
Rugby union players from Bloemfontein
Sharks (rugby union) players
Sharks (Currie Cup) players
Ulster Rugby players
South African expatriate rugby union players
South African expatriate sportspeople in Northern Ireland
Expatriate rugby union players in Northern Ireland
Montpellier Hérault Rugby players
Free State Cheetahs players
Cheetahs (rugby union) players
Expatriate rugby union players in France
South African expatriate sportspeople in France